The 1924 Pittsburgh Pirates season was the 43rd season of the Pittsburgh Pirates franchise; the 38th in the National League. The Pirates finished third in the league standings with a record of 90–63.

Regular season

Season standings

Record vs. opponents

Game log

|- bgcolor="ffbbbb"
| 1 || April 15 || @ Reds || 5–6 || Sheehan || Meadows (0–1) || — || 35,747 || 0–1
|- bgcolor="ccffcc"
| 2 || April 16 || @ Reds || 1–0 || Cooper (1–0) || Luque || — || — || 1–1
|- bgcolor="ffbbbb"
| 3 || April 18 || @ Reds || 2–3 || May || Kremer (0–1) || — || — || 1–2
|- bgcolor="ccffcc"
| 4 || April 19 || @ Cardinals || 4–2 || Meadows (1–1) || Pfeffer || — || — || 2–2
|- bgcolor="ffbbbb"
| 5 || April 20 || @ Cardinals || 2–3 || Doak || Morrison (0–1) || — || — || 2–3
|- bgcolor="ffbbbb"
| 6 || April 21 || @ Cardinals || 9–11 || Sherdel || Steineder (0–1) || Doak || 2,000 || 2–4
|- bgcolor="ccffcc"
| 7 || April 22 || @ Cardinals || 10–7 || Kremer (1–1) || Dyer || — || 2,000 || 3–4
|- bgcolor="ffbbbb"
| 8 || April 24 || Reds || 4–5 || Donohue || Meadows (1–2) || — || 28,000 || 3–5
|- bgcolor="ffbbbb"
| 9 || April 25 || Reds || 4–10 || Luque || Morrison (0–2) || — || — || 3–6
|- bgcolor="ccffcc"
| 10 || April 26 || Reds || 2–0 || Kremer (2–1) || Mays || — || 26,000 || 4–6
|- bgcolor="ffbbbb"
| 11 || April 27 || @ Cubs || 2–4 || Kaufmann || Lundgren (0–1) || — || 4,000 || 4–7
|- bgcolor="ccffcc"
| 12 || April 28 || @ Cubs || 7–4 || Cooper (2–0) || Keen || — || — || 5–7
|- bgcolor="ffbbbb"
| 13 || April 29 || @ Cubs || 1–2 (11) || Alexander || Meadows (1–3) || — || 12,000 || 5–8
|- bgcolor="ccffcc"
| 14 || April 30 || @ Cubs || 2–1 (14) || Morrison (1–2) || Jacobs || — || 5,000 || 6–8
|-

|- bgcolor="ccffcc"
| 15 || May 1 || Cardinals || 8–6 || Kremer (3–1) || Haines || — || 5,000 || 7–8
|- bgcolor="ccffcc"
| 16 || May 2 || Cardinals || 3–2 || Cooper (3–0) || Pfeffer || — || 4,000 || 8–8
|- bgcolor="ccffcc"
| 17 || May 3 || Cardinals || 6–5 || Stone (1–0) || Stuart || — || 8,000 || 9–8
|- bgcolor="ffbbbb"
| 18 || May 4 || @ Reds || 0–2 || Luque || Meadows (1–4) || — || — || 9–9
|- bgcolor="ffbbbb"
| 19 || May 4 || @ Reds || 4–5 || May || Morrison (1–3) || — || — || 9–10
|- bgcolor="ccffcc"
| 20 || May 6 || Cubs || 2–0 || Kremer (4–1) || Aldridge || — || — || 10–10
|- bgcolor="ffbbbb"
| 21 || May 7 || Cubs || 1–5 || Kaufmann || Cooper (3–1) || — || 8,000 || 10–11
|- bgcolor="ffbbbb"
| 22 || May 9 || Braves || 7–10 || McNamara || Morrison (1–4) || Genewich || — || 10–12
|- bgcolor="ffbbbb"
| 23 || May 10 || Braves || 0–2 || Barnes || Kremer (4–2) || — || — || 10–13
|- bgcolor="ccffcc"
| 24 || May 13 || Braves || 5–1 || Cooper (4–1) || Marquard || — || — || 11–13
|- bgcolor="ccffcc"
| 25 || May 15 || Phillies || 4–3 || Morrison (2–4) || Couch || — || — || 12–13
|- bgcolor="ffbbbb"
| 26 || May 16 || Phillies || 3–4 (10) || Betts || Kremer (4–3) || — || — || 12–14
|- bgcolor="ffbbbb"
| 27 || May 17 || Phillies || 8–12 || Couch || Cooper (4–2) || — || — || 12–15
|- bgcolor="ccffcc"
| 28 || May 19 || Giants || 6–3 || Morrison (3–4) || Watson || — || 15,000 || 13–15
|- bgcolor="ccffcc"
| 29 || May 20 || Giants || 12–3 || Meadows (2–4) || Dean || — || 15,000 || 14–15
|- bgcolor="ffbbbb"
| 30 || May 21 || Giants || 8–10 || Bentley || Kremer (4–4) || McQuillan || 20,000 || 14–16
|- bgcolor="ffbbbb"
| 31 || May 22 || Robins || 2–4 || Vance || Cooper (4–3) || — || 3,000 || 14–17
|- bgcolor="ffbbbb"
| 32 || May 23 || Robins || 1–3 || Grimes || Morrison (3–5) || — || 5,000 || 14–18
|- bgcolor="ccffcc"
| 33 || May 25 || @ Robins || 5–2 (11) || Meadows (3–4) || Ruether || — || 26,000 || 15–18
|- bgcolor="ccffcc"
| 34 || May 27 || @ Cubs || 5–4 (10) || Morrison (4–5) || Kaufmann || — || — || 16–18
|- bgcolor="ffbbbb"
| 35 || May 28 || @ Cubs || 6–9 || Aldridge || Cooper (4–4) || — || — || 16–19
|- bgcolor="ffbbbb"
| 36 || May 29 || @ Cubs || 2–5 || Keen || Morrison (4–6) || — || — || 16–20
|- bgcolor="ccffcc"
| 37 || May 30 || Cardinals || 4–0 || Cooper (5–4) || Haines || — || 10,000 || 17–20
|- bgcolor="ccffcc"
| 38 || May 30 || Cardinals || 3–2 (15) || Kremer (5–4) || Bell || — || 18,000 || 18–20
|- bgcolor="ccffcc"
| 39 || May 31 || Cardinals || 7–0 || Yde (1–0) || Pfeffer || — || 9,000 || 19–20
|-

|- bgcolor="ffbbbb"
| 40 || June 1 || @ Cubs || 1–2 || Aldridge || Morrison (4–7) || — || 12,000 || 19–21
|- bgcolor="ccffcc"
| 41 || June 2 || Cardinals || 6–2 || Kremer (6–4) || Dyer || Cooper (1) || 3,000 || 20–21
|- bgcolor="ffbbbb"
| 42 || June 5 || @ Robins || 2–6 || Vance || Cooper (5–5) || — || 4,000 || 20–22
|- bgcolor="ffbbbb"
| 43 || June 7 || @ Robins || 1–4 || Grimes || Meadows (3–5) || — || 12,000 || 20–23
|- bgcolor="ffbbbb"
| 44 || June 8 || @ Giants || 0–7 (5) || Watson || Morrison (4–8) || — || 20,000 || 20–24
|- bgcolor="ffbbbb"
| 45 || June 9 || @ Giants || 4–6 || Oeschger || Cooper (5–6) || Barnes || 10,000 || 20–25
|- bgcolor="ccffcc"
| 46 || June 10 || @ Giants || 10–6 || Stone (2–0) || Barnes || Morrison (1) || 10,000 || 21–25
|- bgcolor="ccffcc"
| 47 || June 11 || @ Giants || 4–2 || Meadows (4–5) || McQuillan || — || 10,000 || 22–25
|- bgcolor="ffbbbb"
| 48 || June 14 || @ Phillies || 1–3 || Ring || Morrison (4–9) || — || — || 22–26
|- bgcolor="ffbbbb"
| 49 || June 16 || @ Braves || 4–9 || Barnes || Cooper (5–7) || — || — || 22–27
|- bgcolor="ccffcc"
| 50 || June 17 || @ Braves || 5–2 || Kremer (7–4) || Yeargin || — || — || 23–27
|- bgcolor="ffbbbb"
| 51 || June 17 || @ Braves || 0–1 || McNamara || Meadows (4–6) || — || 12,000 || 23–28
|- bgcolor="ccffcc"
| 52 || June 18 || @ Braves || 4–3 || Yde (2–0) || Benton || — || 2,500 || 24–28
|- bgcolor="ccffcc"
| 53 || June 20 || Reds || 9–4 || Kremer (8–4) || Rixey || — || — || 25–28
|- bgcolor="ccffcc"
| 54 || June 21 || Reds || 1–0 || Meadows (5–6) || Sheehan || — || 15,000 || 26–28
|- bgcolor="ffbbbb"
| 55 || June 22 || @ Reds || 4–9 || Benton || Morrison (4–10) || — || 8,513 || 26–29
|- bgcolor="ccffcc"
| 56 || June 23 || @ Reds || 4–2 || Cooper (6–7) || Luque || — || — || 27–29
|- bgcolor="ccffcc"
| 57 || June 24 || @ Reds || 4–3 || Kremer (9–4) || Rixey || — || — || 28–29
|- bgcolor="ccffcc"
| 58 || June 25 || Cubs || 8–7 (14) || Yde (3–0) || Alexander || — || 7,000 || 29–29
|- bgcolor="ccffcc"
| 59 || June 26 || Cubs || 2–1 || Morrison (5–10) || Aldridge || — || — || 30–29
|- bgcolor="ccffcc"
| 60 || June 27 || Cubs || 9–0 || Cooper (7–7) || Jacobs || — || — || 31–29
|- bgcolor="ccffcc"
| 61 || June 28 || Cubs || 3–0 || Kremer (10–4) || Keen || — || — || 32–29
|- bgcolor="ccffcc"
| 62 || June 29 || @ Cardinals || 6–5 || Meadows (6–6) || Dickerman || Morrison (2) || — || 33–29
|- bgcolor="ffbbbb"
| 63 || June 30 || @ Cardinals || 5–7 || Sherdel || Stone (2–1) || — || 3,500 || 33–30
|-

|- bgcolor="ffbbbb"
| 64 || July 1 || @ Cardinals || 2–5 || Stuart || Morrison (5–11) || — || — || 33–31
|- bgcolor="ccffcc"
| 65 || July 2 || @ Cardinals || 3–2 || Cooper (8–7) || Haines || — || 2,000 || 34–31
|- bgcolor="ffbbbb"
| 66 || July 4 || Reds || 0–8 || Luque || Kremer (10–5) || — || — || 34–32
|- bgcolor="ffbbbb"
| 67 || July 4 || Reds || 2–4 || Rixey || Meadows (6–7) || Benton || — || 34–33
|- bgcolor="ccffcc"
| 68 || July 5 || Reds || 11–4 || Stone (3–1) || Donohue || — || — || 35–33
|- bgcolor="ccffcc"
| 69 || July 6 || @ Reds || 9–2 || Cooper (9–7) || May || — || 10,000 || 36–33
|- bgcolor="ccffcc"
| 70 || July 7 || Robins || 9–5 || Yde (4–0) || Grimes || — || — || 37–33
|- bgcolor="ccffcc"
| 71 || July 8 || Braves || 8–3 || Morrison (6–11) || McNamara || — || — || 38–33
|- bgcolor="ffbbbb"
| 72 || July 9 || Braves || 3–6 || Genewich || Kremer (10–6) || — || 5,000 || 38–34
|- bgcolor="ffbbbb"
| 73 || July 10 || Braves || 3–5 || Barnes || Meadows (6–8) || — || — || 38–35
|- bgcolor="ccffcc"
| 74 || July 11 || Braves || 8–2 || Cooper (10–7) || Lucas || — || — || 39–35
|- bgcolor="ccffcc"
| 75 || July 12 || Phillies || 6–5 (10) || Stone (4–1) || Mitchell || — || — || 40–35
|- bgcolor="ccffcc"
| 76 || July 12 || Phillies || 3–2 (11) || Yde (5–0) || Hubbell || — || — || 41–35
|- bgcolor="ffbbbb"
| 77 || July 14 || Phillies || 3–8 || Carlson || Kremer (10–7) || — || 3,000 || 41–36
|- bgcolor="ccffcc"
| 78 || July 15 || Phillies || 3–1 || Meadows (7–8) || Glazner || — || 3,000 || 42–36
|- bgcolor="ffbbbb"
| 79 || July 16 || Giants || 7–8 || Ryan || Cooper (10–8) || Jonnard || 15,000 || 42–37
|- bgcolor="ccffcc"
| 80 || July 17 || Giants || 4–3 (13) || Morrison (7–11) || McQuillan || — || 15,000 || 43–37
|- bgcolor="ccffcc"
| 81 || July 18 || Giants || 9–2 || Cooper (11–8) || Bentley || — || 12,000 || 44–37
|- bgcolor="ffbbbb"
| 82 || July 19 || Giants || 6–10 || Watson || Meadows (7–9) || — || 31,000 || 44–38
|- bgcolor="ffbbbb"
| 83 || July 21 || Robins || 2–6 || Vance || Meadows (7–10) || — || 8,000 || 44–39
|- bgcolor="ccffcc"
| 84 || July 21 || Robins || 4–2 || Kremer (11–7) || Grimes || — || 12,000 || 45–39
|- bgcolor="ffbbbb"
| 85 || July 22 || Robins || 1–4 (5) || Osborne || Morrison (7–12) || — || 4,000 || 45–40
|- bgcolor="ffbbbb"
| 86 || July 23 || Robins || 3–4 (10) || Decatur || Cooper (11–9) || — || 4,000 || 45–41
|- bgcolor="ccffcc"
| 87 || July 24 || Robins || 8–1 || Yde (6–0) || Roberts || — || 3,500 || 46–41
|- bgcolor="ccffcc"
| 88 || July 25 || @ Braves || 2–1 || Pfeffer (1–0) || Genewich || — || 2,000 || 47–41
|- bgcolor="ccffcc"
| 89 || July 26 || @ Braves || 7–6 (14) || Cooper (12–9) || Barnes || — || — || 48–41
|- bgcolor="ccffcc"
| 90 || July 28 || @ Braves || 5–2 || Yde (7–0) || Yeargin || — || — || 49–41
|- bgcolor="ccffcc"
| 91 || July 29 || @ Braves || 8–1 || Kremer (12–7) || Genewich || — || — || 50–41
|- bgcolor="ccffcc"
| 92 || July 30 || @ Giants || 6–3 || Cooper (13–9) || Jonnard || — || 10,000 || 51–41
|- bgcolor="ccffcc"
| 93 || July 31 || @ Giants || 5–0 (6) || Meadows (8–10) || Watson || — || 6,000 || 52–41
|-

|- bgcolor="ffbbbb"
| 94 || August 1 || @ Giants || 1–3 || Barnes || Morrison (7–13) || — || 8,000 || 52–42
|- bgcolor="ccffcc"
| 95 || August 2 || @ Giants || 7–6 || Kremer (13–7) || Dean || — || 25,000 || 53–42
|- bgcolor="ccffcc"
| 96 || August 3 || @ Robins || 5–2 || Yde (8–0) || Grimes || — || — || 54–42
|- bgcolor="ccffcc"
| 97 || August 4 || @ Robins || 5–3 || Cooper (14–9) || Osborne || — || 3,000 || 55–42
|- bgcolor="ccffcc"
| 98 || August 5 || @ Robins || 8–1 || Kremer (14–7) || Ruether || — || 4,500 || 56–42
|- bgcolor="ffbbbb"
| 99 || August 6 || @ Robins || 3–5 || Vance || Stone (4–2) || — || 4,500 || 56–43
|- bgcolor="ffbbbb"
| 100 || August 7 || @ Robins || 6–9 || Grimes || Yde (8–1) || — || 4,000 || 56–44
|- bgcolor="ccffcc"
| 101 || August 8 || @ Phillies || 1–0 || Meadows (9–10) || Ring || — || — || 57–44
|- bgcolor="ccffcc"
| 102 || August 9 || @ Phillies || 16–4 || Cooper (15–9) || Oeschger || — || — || 58–44
|- bgcolor="ccffcc"
| 103 || August 9 || @ Phillies || 7–0 || Kremer (15–7) || Mitchell || — || — || 59–44
|- bgcolor="ccffcc"
| 104 || August 11 || @ Phillies || 7–3 || Yde (9–1) || Glazner || — || — || 60–44
|- bgcolor="ccffcc"
| 105 || August 11 || @ Phillies || 6–4 || Pfeffer (2–0) || Betts || Kremer (1) || — || 61–44
|- bgcolor="ccffcc"
| 106 || August 13 || Giants || 4–2 || Meadows (10–10) || Barnes || — || 20,000 || 62–44
|- bgcolor="ccffcc"
| 107 || August 14 || Giants || 3–1 || Cooper (16–9) || McQuillan || — || 25,000 || 63–44
|- bgcolor="ccffcc"
| 108 || August 15 || Giants || 6–4 || Kremer (16–7) || Nehf || — || 24,000 || 64–44
|- bgcolor="ccffcc"
| 109 || August 16 || Giants || 5–4 (12) || Morrison (8–13) || Barnes || — || 33,500 || 65–44
|- bgcolor="ffbbbb"
| 110 || August 18 || Robins || 4–7 || Grimes || Pfeffer (2–1) || — || 8,000 || 65–45
|- bgcolor="ffbbbb"
| 111 || August 19 || Robins || 3–4 || Vance || Cooper (16–10) || — || 16,000 || 65–46
|- bgcolor="ffbbbb"
| 112 || August 20 || Robins || 2–3 (11) || Doak || Kremer (16–8) || — || 5,000 || 65–47
|- bgcolor="ffbbbb"
| 113 || August 21 || Braves || 6–7 || Lucas || Morrison (8–14) || Benton || — || 65–48
|- bgcolor="ccffcc"
| 114 || August 21 || Braves || 5–0 || Yde (10–1) || Cooney || — || — || 66–48
|- bgcolor="ccffcc"
| 115 || August 22 || Braves || 3–0 || Cooper (17–10) || Benton || — || — || 67–48
|- bgcolor="ccffcc"
| 116 || August 23 || Braves || 3–2 || Kremer (17–8) || Yeargin || — || — || 68–48
|- bgcolor="ccffcc"
| 117 || August 25 || Phillies || 7–4 || Meadows (11–10) || Oeschger || — || — || 69–48
|- bgcolor="ccffcc"
| 118 || August 26 || Phillies || 6–1 || Yde (11–1) || Ring || — || — || 70–48
|- bgcolor="ffbbbb"
| 119 || August 26 || Phillies || 1–3 || Hubbell || Morrison (8–15) || — || — || 70–49
|- bgcolor="ffbbbb"
| 120 || August 27 || Phillies || 6–7 || Carlson || Pfeffer (2–2) || Couch || — || 70–50
|- bgcolor="ffbbbb"
| 121 || August 28 || Reds || 4–5 || Mays || Cooper (17–11) || — || — || 70–51
|- bgcolor="ccffcc"
| 122 || August 29 || Reds || 5–4 || Morrison (9–15) || Sheehan || — || — || 71–51
|- bgcolor="ccffcc"
| 123 || August 30 || Reds || 12–3 || Cooper (18–11) || Rixey || — || — || 72–51
|- bgcolor="ccffcc"
| 124 || August 31 || @ Cubs || 2–0 || Yde (12–1) || Jacobs || — || 20,000 || 73–51
|-

|- bgcolor="ccffcc"
| 125 || September 1 || Cubs || 5–4 (10) || Morrison (10–15) || Wheeler || — || 20,000 || 74–51
|- bgcolor="ccffcc"
| 126 || September 1 || Cubs || 4–3 || Adams (1–0) || Aldridge || — || 40,000 || 75–51
|- bgcolor="ccffcc"
| 127 || September 3 || Cardinals || 14–1 || Cooper (19–11) || Bell || — || 4,500 || 76–51
|- bgcolor="ffbbbb"
| 128 || September 4 || Cardinals || 5–9 || Sothoron || Kremer (17–9) || — || 4,000 || 76–52
|- bgcolor="ccffcc"
| 129 || September 6 || Cardinals || 5–2 || Yde (13–1) || Stuart || — || 10,000 || 77–52
|- bgcolor="ccffcc"
| 130 || September 6 || Cardinals || 12–5 || Pfeffer (3–2) || Rhem || — || — || 78–52
|- bgcolor="ffbbbb"
| 131 || September 7 || @ Reds || 1–4 || Luque || Cooper (19–12) || — || — || 78–53
|- bgcolor="ffbbbb"
| 132 || September 7 || @ Reds || 3–4 || Mays || Adams (1–1) || — || — || 78–54
|- bgcolor="ffbbbb"
| 133 || September 9 || @ Cardinals || 4–7 || Sothoron || Yde (13–2) || — || 2,000 || 78–55
|- bgcolor="ffbbbb"
| 134 || September 9 || @ Cardinals || 4–6 || Stuart || Morrison (10–16) || — || 3,500 || 78–56
|- bgcolor="ccffcc"
| 135 || September 10 || @ Cardinals || 3–1 || Adams (2–1) || Haines || — || 1,000 || 79–56
|- bgcolor="ccffcc"
| 136 || September 12 || @ Braves || 5–4 || Pfeffer (4–2) || Barnes || — || 2,000 || 80–56
|- bgcolor="ccffcc"
| 137 || September 13 || @ Braves || 7–0 || Yde (14–2) || Graham || — || 5,000 || 81–56
|- bgcolor="ccffcc"
| 138 || September 15 || @ Braves || 4–3 (12) || Morrison (11–16) || Cooney || — || — || 82–56
|- bgcolor="ffbbbb"
| 139 || September 16 || @ Phillies || 5–6 || Hubbell || Cooper (19–13) || Betts || — || 82–57
|- bgcolor="ccffcc"
| 140 || September 16 || @ Phillies || 13–7 || Meadows (12–10) || Ring || — || — || 83–57
|- bgcolor="ffbbbb"
| 141 || September 18 || @ Phillies || 5–6 || Oeschger || Kremer (17–10) || — || — || 83–58
|- bgcolor="ccffcc"
| 142 || September 18 || @ Phillies || 6–3 || Meadows (13–10) || Carlson || — || — || 84–58
|- bgcolor="ccffcc"
| 143 || September 19 || @ Robins || 4–2 || Yde (15–2) || Ehrhardt || — || 12,000 || 85–58
|- bgcolor="ccffcc"
| 144 || September 20 || @ Robins || 5–4 (11) || Cooper (20–13) || Vance || — || 30,000 || 86–58
|- bgcolor="ffbbbb"
| 145 || September 21 || @ Robins || 1–2 (10) || Grimes || Pfeffer (4–3) || — || 28,000 || 86–59
|- bgcolor="ffbbbb"
| 146 || September 23 || @ Giants || 1–5 || McQuillan || Meadows (13–11) || — || 30,000 || 86–60
|- bgcolor="ffbbbb"
| 147 || September 24 || @ Giants || 2–4 || Barnes || Yde (15–3) || — || 25,000 || 86–61
|- bgcolor="ffbbbb"
| 148 || September 25 || @ Giants || 4–5 || Nehf || Cooper (20–14) || — || 25,000 || 86–62
|- bgcolor="ccffcc"
| 149 || September 26 || Cubs || 9–3 || Kremer (18–10) || Keen || — || — || 87–62
|- bgcolor="ccffcc"
| 150 || September 26 || Cubs || 10–6 || Pfeffer (5–3) || Kaufmann || — || 4,000 || 88–62
|- bgcolor="ccffcc"
| 151 || September 27 || Cubs || 3–2 (10) || Adams (3–1) || Aldridge || — || 4,000 || 89–62
|- bgcolor="ffbbbb"
| 152 || September 28 || @ Cubs || 2–7 || Jacobs || Meadows (13–12) || — || 7,000 || 89–63
|- bgcolor="ccffcc"
| 153 || September 29 || @ Cubs || 5–4 || Yde (16–3) || Blake || Songer (1) || 1,500 || 90–63
|-

|-
| Legend:       = Win       = LossBold = Pirates team member

Opening Day lineup

Roster

Player stats

Batting

Starters by position 
Note: Pos = Position; G = Games played; AB = At bats; H = Hits; Avg. = Batting average; HR = Home runs; RBI = Runs batted in

Other batters 
Note: G = Games played; AB = At bats; H = Hits; Avg. = Batting average; HR = Home runs; RBI = Runs batted in

Pitching

Starting pitchers 
Note: G = Games pitched; IP = Innings pitched; W = Wins; L = Losses; ERA = Earned run average; SO = Strikeouts

Other pitchers 
Note: G = Games pitched; IP = Innings pitched; W = Wins; L = Losses; ERA = Earned run average; SO = Strikeouts

Relief pitchers 
Note: G = Games pitched; W = Wins; L = Losses; SV = Saves; ERA = Earned run average; SO = Strikeouts

Farm system

LEAGUE CHAMPIONS: Williamsport

References 

 1924 Pittsburgh Pirates team page at Baseball Reference
 1924 Pittsburgh Pirates Page at Baseball Almanac

Pittsburgh Pirates seasons
Pittsburgh Pirates season
Pittsburg Pir